North Salem Town Hall is a historic town hall located at Salem Center, Westchester County, New York. It was built about 1770 by the DeLancey family as a private home. It has been used for governmental and educational functions since 1773.  It is a three-story frame building, covered in clapboard, five bays wide and three bays deep on a fieldstone foundation in a vernacular Georgian style.  It has a gambrel roof topped by a six-sided cupola. From 1790 to 1884 it housed the North Salem Academy and, after 1886, the town offices of North Salem, New York.

It was added to the National Register of Historic Places in 1980.

See also
National Register of Historic Places listings in northern Westchester County, New York

References

City and town halls on the National Register of Historic Places in New York (state)
Georgian architecture in New York (state)
Government buildings completed in 1770
Buildings and structures in Westchester County, New York
National Register of Historic Places in Westchester County, New York
1770 establishments in the Province of New York